Jorge Toral Azuela served as the International Commissioner of the Asociación de Scouts de México, Asociación Civil.

In 1975, he was awarded the 103rd Bronze Wolf, the only distinction of the World Organization of the Scout Movement, awarded by the World Scout Committee for exceptional services to world Scouting, at the 25th World Scout Conference. He was also a recipient of the Silver World Award.

References

External links

Recipients of the Bronze Wolf Award
Year of birth missing
Scouting and Guiding in Mexico